Jacob Westervelt may refer to:

Jacob Aaron Westervelt (1800–1879), shipbuilder and New York City Mayor
Jacob Westervelt (sheriff) (1794–1881), High Sheriff of New York City and Assistant Alderman
Jacob A. Westervelt (pilot boat), 19th-century New York pilot boat